Frank Turnbull (born January 13, 1954) is a Canadian former professional ice hockey goaltender.

Between 1975–76 and 1977–78 Turnbull played four games in the World Hockey Association with the Edmonton Oilers.

Awards and honours

References
Edmonton Oilers: Goaltending History

External links

1954 births
Living people
Canadian ice hockey goaltenders
Edmonton Oilers (WHA) players
Western International Hockey League players
Winnipeg Jets (WHL) players
Ice hockey people from Winnipeg